"Planetary (Go!)" is a single from My Chemical Romance's fourth studio album, Danger Days: The True Lives of the Fabulous Killjoys as well as the fifth track on the album. Beneath the band's name and song title on the cover art of the single, the Japanese word for go, 行け (go) can be seen. The song was nominated for the Kerrang! Award for Best Single.

Release
The song was first available to be heard in the video game Gran Turismo 5 (except the Japanese version), released in November 2010, as it is featured in the game's intro video. On February 4, 2011, My Chemical Romance announced that the song would be released on March 21, 2011, as the next single on their official website. It is also used in the video game F1 2011. It was also used in an advert for Super Bowl XLV. The single was later delayed until March 25 for Ireland and March 28 for the UK and USA. The download single featured two remix tracks as B-sides, including one by Lags, lead singer of Gallows.

Music video
In a Question and Answer interview with fans, a fan asked if a video was ready for the song and said if it isn't ready can fans give suggestions, they suggested the video being "a massive party, with you guys not in it". Gerard Way mentioned that he thought of the video being that, "a big party, somewhere in a warehouse where it wasn't supposed to be happening, something like that, maybe something in a basement." The music video was filmed on February 24, 2011, at the O2 Academy, Islington. The video first premiered on My Chemical Romance's Facebook page on March 21, 2011. The video starts off including Japanese characters with English subtitles underneath. Then the band is seen playing at Islington's O2 academy in front of a crowd. Tickets were on sale the day before for fans to attend the performance.

As of September 2021, the song has 15 million views on YouTube.

Chart performance

Track listing
Version 1 (promotional CD)

Version 2 (digital download)

Music video personnel 
My Chemical Romance 
 Frank Iero — rhythm guitar, backing vocals
 Ray Toro — lead guitar, backing vocals
 Gerard Way — lead vocals
 Mikey Way — bass
 James Dewees — Synth, keyboards and percussion

Additional musicians
 Michael Pedicone — drums

References

2011 singles
Songs written by Frank Iero
Songs written by Ray Toro
Songs written by Mikey Way
My Chemical Romance songs
Song recordings produced by Rob Cavallo
Songs written by Gerard Way
2010 songs
Reprise Records singles